"Swinging on a Star" is an American pop standard with music composed by Jimmy Van Heusen and lyrics by Johnny Burke. It was introduced by Bing Crosby in the 1944 film Going My Way, winning an Academy Award for Best Original Song that year, and has been recorded by numerous artists since then. In 2004, it finished at No. 37 in AFI's 100 Years...100 Songs survey of top tunes in American cinema.

Origins
Songwriter Jimmy Van Heusen was at Crosby's house one evening for dinner, and to discuss a song for the film project Going My Way. During the meal, one of the children began complaining about how he did not want to go to school the next day. The singer turned to his son Gary and said to him, "If you don’t go to school, you might grow up to be a mule." Van Heusen thought this clever rebuke would make a good song for the film. He pictured Crosby, who played a priest, talking to a group of children acting much the same way as his own child had acted that night. Van Heusen took the idea to his partner lyricist Johnny Burke, who approved. They wrote the song.

Composition
"The lyrics follow the usual verse-refrain format". The length of the composition is unusual: the refrain is just 8 bars in length, and the verse is 12 bars. Besides the mule, the other animals listed are the pig and the fish.

In the Coda section, it ends with this stanza:

"And all the monkeys aren't in the zoo / Every day you meet quite a few / So you see, it's all up to you / You could be better than you are / You could be swinging on a star".

Recordings
The first recording of "Swinging on a Star", with Bing Crosby with John Scott Trotter and His Orchestra, took place in Los Angeles on February 7, 1944, and was released as Decca Records on Disc No. 18597 paired with "Going My Way". The song topped the USA charts in 1944 and Australian charts in 1945. The Williams Brothers Quartet, including a young Andy Williams, sang backup vocals behind Crosby.
 Shari Lewis covered the song on her first album (1957)
 Orlando Silva interpreted the Portuguese version of the song "Se Quer Ser Alguém" in 1948 with Quatro Ases e Um Coringa band
 Frank Sinatra covered the song in his album "Sinatra sings Academy Award winning songs (1963)
A 1963 recording by Big Dee Irwin and Little Eva reached No. 38 in the Billboard Hot 100 in the US and No. 7 in the UK Singles Chart in January 1964. 
Also in 1964, Richard Anthony sang a French version, "À toi de choisir".
Folk legend Dave Van Ronk recorded the song with the Hudson Dusters in 1967, and later as a solo version on his 1976 album Sunday Street.

Influences
In 1969, Ray Stevens quoted the line of the song with the wrong melody in his novelty hit "Gitarzan" (1969) ("Carrying moonbeams home in a jar").
The song, sung by Bruce Willis and Danny Aiello, is featured in the 1991 movie Hudson Hawk.

Awards and honors
Academy Award for Best Original Song (1944)
Grammy Hall of Fame (2002)

See also
List of number-one singles of 1944 (U.S.)
Out of This World – an American television series that used a version of the song as the theme

References

1944 songs
1944 singles
Bing Crosby songs
Songs with music by Jimmy Van Heusen
Songs with lyrics by Johnny Burke (lyricist)
Best Original Song Academy Award-winning songs
Number-one singles in the United States
Music published by Bourne Co. Music Publishers